Madeley railway station (sometimes referred to as Madeley Salop railway station) is a disused railway station in Madeley, Shropshire, England.

The station was opened by the Great Western Railway in 1859 as Madeley Court. In 1897 it was renamed simply Madeley.  The station was closed in 1915 but reopened in July 1925 only to close permanently in September of the same year.

References
Notes

Sources

Further reading

Disused railway stations in Shropshire
Former Great Western Railway stations
Railway stations in Great Britain opened in 1859
Railway stations in Great Britain closed in 1915
Railway stations in Great Britain opened in 1925
Railway stations in Great Britain closed in 1925